Feather Peak is a 13,240-foot-elevation (4,036 meter) mountain summit located west of the Royce Lakes in the Sierra Nevada mountain range in northern California, United States. It is situated in Fresno County, in the John Muir Wilderness, on land managed by Sierra National Forest. Feather Peak is the 99th highest summit in California. The first ascent of the summit was made in July 1933 by David Brower, who also named this peak.

Climate
According to the Köppen climate classification system, Feather Peak is located in an alpine climate zone. Most weather fronts originate in the Pacific Ocean, and travel east toward the Sierra Nevada mountains. As fronts approach, they are forced upward by the peaks, causing them to drop their moisture in the form of rain or snowfall onto the range (orographic lift). Precipitation runoff from this mountain drains south into tributaries of the San Joaquin River.

Climbing
Established climbing routes on Feather Peak:

 Southeast Slope  –  – First Ascent 1933
 Southwest Ridge  – class 4
 Northeast Face – class 5.9 – 10 pitches – FA 1966
 Feather Couloir (North Couloir) – class AI2 – 4 pitches 
 North Ridge – class 5.4 – FA 1992

See also
List of mountain peaks of California

References

External links

 Weather forecast: Feather Peak
 Feather Peak Climbing: Mountainproject.com
Sierra National Forest
Mountains of Fresno County, California
Mountains of the John Muir Wilderness
North American 4000 m summits
Mountains of Northern California
Sierra Nevada (United States)